Chicoutimi—Le Fjord (formerly known as Chicoutimi) is a federal electoral district in Quebec, Canada, that has been represented in the House of Commons of Canada since 1925. The riding consists of the northern part of the Chicoutimi borough of Saguenay, as well as the La Baie borough and the municipalities of Ferland-et-Boilleau, L'Anse-Saint-Jean, Petit-Saguenay, Rivière-Éternité and Saint-Félix-d'Otis and the unorganized territory of Lalemant.

It was created as "Chicoutimi" riding in 1924 from Chicoutimi—Saguenay. It was renamed "Chicoutimi—Le Fjord" in 2000.

The neighbouring ridings are Manicouagan, Beauport—Côte-de-Beaupré—Île d'Orléans—Charlevoix, and Jonquière.

Richard Martel won the 2018 by-election.

Geography
The riding has always been centred on the city (now borough) of Chicoutimi, Quebec. When it was created, the riding consisted of Chicoutimi County until 1947, when the western half of the riding became the new riding of Lapointe. The 1976 redistribution removed all of the riding's territory north of the Saguenay River. This territory was added back to the riding in the 2003 redistribution. This riding lost some territory to Jonquière during the 2012 electoral redistribution, including much of the area north of the Saguenay River again.

Demographics
According to the Canada 2021 Census

Ethnocultural groups: 93.8% European, 3.7% Indigenous, 2.5% Other
Languages: 96.9% French, 0.9% English
Religion: 77.9%% Christian (71.4% Catholic), 0.8% Muslim, 21.0% None 
Median income: $32,291 (2015) 
Average income: $40,803 (2015)

Members of Parliament
This riding has elected the following Members of Parliament:

The riding followed the typical path of most nationalist Quebec ridings, except for an independent being elected (1945–1957), and former MP André Harvey narrowly defeating incumbent Gilbert Fillion in 1997, one of only a few PC seats in Quebec that year.

Election results

 			
	

	
Note: Conservative vote is compared to the Canadian Alliance vote in the 2000 election.

		

	
	

	

	
Note: Social Credit vote is compared to Ralliement créditiste vote in the 1968 election.
	

Note: Ralliement créditiste vote is compared to Social Credit vote in the 1963 election.	

 	

	
Note: "National Government" vote is compared to Conservative vote in 1935 election.

Note: Alfred Dubuc's popular vote as a Liberal candidate is compared to his popular vote as an independent Liberal candidate in the 1926 general election.

See also
 List of Canadian federal electoral districts
 Past Canadian electoral districts

References

Campaign expense data from Elections Canada
2011 Results from Elections Canada
Riding history from the Library of Parliament

Notes

Quebec federal electoral districts
Politics of Saguenay, Quebec